John Bel Edwards (born September 16, 1966) is an American politician and attorney serving as the 56th governor of Louisiana since 2016. A member of the Democratic Party, he previously served as the Democratic leader of the Louisiana House of Representatives for two terms.

First elected to the Louisiana House in 2007, Edwards became Democratic minority leader in 2012. He defeated Republican U.S. Senator David Vitter in the second round of the 2015 election for governor. Edwards won a second term in 2019, becoming the first Democrat to win reelection as governor of Louisiana since Edwin Edwards (no relation) in 1975. He is a United States Army veteran, having served with the 82nd Airborne Division, reaching the rank of captain. He is Louisiana's only statewide elected Democratic official.

Many political observers consider Edwards to be a conservative Democrat.

Early life and education
John Bel Edwards was born in East Baton Rouge Parish, Louisiana on September 16, 1966. He was raised in Amite, Louisiana, the son of Dora Jean (née Miller) and Tangipahoa Parish Sheriff Frank M. Edwards, Jr. Born into an economically and politically well-established family in the parish, he graduated from Amite High School in 1984 as valedictorian.

In 1988, Edwards received a bachelor's degree in engineering from the United States Military Academy, where he was on the Dean's List and served as vice chairman of the panel that enforced the West Point honor code.

Edwards completed Airborne School in 1986, while a student at West Point. After receiving his commission, he completed the Infantry Officer Basic Course at Fort Benning in 1988, Ranger School in 1989, and the Infantry Officer Advanced Course in 1992. 

Edwards served in the United States Army for eight years, mostly in the 25th Infantry Division and 82nd Airborne Division. He commanded a company in the 82nd's 3rd Brigade, 505th Parachute Infantry Regiment. Edwards ultimately ended his military career to return to Louisiana because of family considerations.

Legal career 
After leaving the Army, Edwards pursued a legal education at Louisiana State University's Paul M. Hebert Law Center (LSU Law). He received his J.D. degree in 1999, and after graduation clerked for Judge James L. Dennis of the United States Court of Appeals for the Fifth Circuit.

Edwards went on to become a practicing attorney with the Edwards & Associates law firm in Amite. He handled a variety of cases, but did not practice criminal law because his brother was the local sheriff. His nephew, Bradley Stevens, worked at the firm as a law partner.

Louisiana House of Representatives 
In 2007, Edwards ran for a seat in the Louisiana House of Representatives and was forced into a general election runoff with fellow attorney George Tucker. Edwards won every parish in the district. He was the only freshman lawmaker to chair a committee, the Veterans Affairs Committee, in the legislature. Edwards was also selected as chair of the Democratic House caucus, a rarity for a freshman legislator. Edwards criticized Governor Bobby Jindal for Jindal's frequent trips away from Louisiana to raise funds for Republicans elsewhere while Louisiana had been reducing its funding for higher education.

In 2011, Edwards was reelected to the Louisiana House of Representatives, defeating Johnny Duncan, 83% to 17%. He chaired the Louisiana House Democratic Caucus, making him the House Minority Leader. Cities and towns that Edwards represented included Amite, Greensburg, and Kentwood as well as part of Hammond.

Governor of Louisiana

Elections

2015

On February 21, 2013, Edwards announced his candidacy for governor in 2015. He said that Louisiana needed "a healthy dose of common sense and compassion for ordinary people". The only major Democrat in the race, Edwards polled first in the nonpartisan blanket primary with 444,517 votes (39.9%), followed by Vitter, who finished second with 256,300 votes (23%). In third place was Louisiana Public Service Commissioner Scott Angelle of Breaux Bridge, who received 214,982 votes (19.3%).

A JMC Analytics poll before the primary showed Edwards with a nine-point lead over Vitter, 28% to 19%. After the primary polls showed Edwards with a commanding lead. Market Research Insight pollster Verne Kennedy placed Edwards ahead, 54% to 38% or 51% to 40%, depending on the level of turnout among African-American voters, 25% or 20%.

Edwards won the November 21 runoff with 56.1% of the vote. The New York Times noted that the gubernatorial race was one "that many other Democrats once considered hopeless" early in the cycle.

2019

In 2019, Edwards ran for reelection to a second term as governor. In the runoff election, he faced Republican businessman Eddie Rispone. As Louisiana voted overwhelmingly for Donald Trump in the 2016 election, the race drew national attention after Trump visited the state multiple times on Rispone's behalf.

Edwards ultimately defeated Rispone, 51.33% to 48.67%. His victory made him the first Democratic governor of Louisiana to be elected to a second consecutive term in over four decades, since Edwin Edwards in 1975.

Tenure

On his inauguration day, Edwards failed to persuade the majority-Republican Louisiana House to choose a Democrat, Walt Leger III of New Orleans, as Speaker. On the second ballot, after Republican Cameron Henry, an ally of Vitter, withdrew from consideration, a second Republican, Taylor Barras of New Iberia, was named Speaker. Since Huey Long, governors had traditionally handpicked the state house speakers. Barras's selection was considered a surprise because he had not been mentioned as a candidate until the voting started.

On April 13, 2016, Edwards signed an executive order to protect lesbian, gay, bisexual, and transgender people from harassment or job dismissals. The order prohibits state agencies from discrimination based on either gender identity or sexual orientation. The order allows an exception for religious organizations that claim that compliance would violate their religious beliefs. "We respect our fellow citizens for their beliefs, but we do not discriminate based on our disagreements. I believe in giving every Louisianan the opportunity to be successful and to thrive in our state", Edwards said.

Edwards also rescinded another executive order issued in 2015 by his predecessor, Bobby Jindal, which protected businesses and nonprofit organizations that oppose same-sex marriage from being legally punished for acting on those views. This order had prohibited state agencies from penalizing businesses and individuals who refuse or limit service because of a "religious belief that marriage is or should be recognized as the union of one man and one woman."

In 2016, Edwards enacted Medicaid expansion. By the next year, the number of Louisianans without health insurance was cut in half (11.4%, down from 22.7%). According to a study conducted by LSU's E.J. Ourso College of Business, Edwards's Medicaid expansion made over 500,000 more adults eligible for Medicaid, of whom 327,000 were uninsured.

Edwards promised early in 2017 that he could work with the incoming Donald Trump administration. He expressed eagerness to work with the Trump Cabinet, particularly on Medicaid expansion and federal infrastructure projects.

In January 2017, Edwards traveled to Italy on a personal trip to discuss ways to combat human trafficking. He traveled with members of the Hospitaller Sisters of Mercy, who established a shelter in Baton Rouge for child victims of human trafficking. Edwards met with Pope Francis during the trip.

Edwards campaigned on a policy to reduce Louisiana's prison population. One of his first actions as governor was to commute 22 sentences out of 56 that the state's Board of Pardons had identified for him. Since the end of 2016 and to July 2018, Edwards did not sign a single commutation despite at least 70 cases that the state's Board of Pardons identified for him during the period. In 2018, Edwards signed legislation that shortened the sentences for nonviolent, non-sex-crime offenders who showed good behavior while in prison.

In May 2018, Edwards signed a bill into law banning abortion after 15 weeks of pregnancy. In May 2019, he signed an even more restrictive six-week abortion ban, although a similar bill in the 5th Circuit, one with a similar predecessor, was blocked by Judge Carlton Reeves in the Southern District of Mississippi. In response to backlash from his more progressive supporters, Edwards released a statement saying, "As governor, I have been true to my word and my beliefs on this issue. But it is also my sincere belief that being pro-life means more than just being pro-birth." He referenced his attempts to expand investment in education, reform Louisiana's criminal justice system, pass laws to protect LGBT citizens from discrimination in the workplace, raise the minimum wage, and ensure equal pay for men and women.

At the end of 2018, Edwards said that his top priority for 2019 was to achieve a $1,000 pay raise for teachers and a $500 raise for school support workers. For the first time in 10 years, the House passed a budget that included pay raises for teachers and support staff.

On September 8, 2021, Edwards delayed all upcoming Louisiana elections five weeks after excessive statewide infrastructure damage caused by Hurricane Ida. On September 12, 2021, less than two weeks after Ida crested, Edwards declared another statewide state of emergency in anticipation of Hurricane Nicholas. On January 5, 2022, Edwards pardoned Homer Plessy, subject of the 1896 U.S. Supreme Court case Plessy v. Ferguson, which upheld segregation laws.

Cabinet and administration

Personal life

Edwards is married to Donna Hutto. She graduated from the University of Southern Mississippi in Hattiesburg with a business degree in industrial management before training as a teacher. They have two daughters, Sarah and Samantha Edwards, and a son, John Miller Edwards.

Edwards is a Catholic and a parishioner of the St. Helena Roman Catholic Church in Amite.

Edwards is the brother of Independence, Louisiana, chief of police Frank Millard Edwards, as well as Tangipahoa Parish Sheriff Daniel H. Edwards. Edwards is brother-in-law to 21st Judicial District Court Juvenile Judge Blair Downing Edwards, a Republican. In 2011, one of Edwards's brothers, Christopher Edwards, died in a car crash after his vehicle veered into oncoming traffic and collided with a UPS truck.

Electoral history

Louisiana House of Representatives
2007

2011

Governor of Louisiana
2015

2019

References

External links

 Office of the Governor official government website
 Campaign website 

 

 Resignation letter from the House

|-

|-

|-

|-

|-

|-

1966 births
21st-century American politicians
Catholics from Louisiana
Democratic Party governors of Louisiana
Living people
Louisiana lawyers
Louisiana State University Law Center alumni
Democratic Party members of the Louisiana House of Representatives
Military personnel from Louisiana
People from Amite City, Louisiana
People from St. Helena Parish, Louisiana
United States Army officers
United States Military Academy alumni